is a city located in Iwate Prefecture, Japan. , the city had an estimated population of 92,311, and a population density of 210 persons per km2 in 37,085 households. The city is famous for the sakura that bloom in Tenshochi Park.

Geography
Kitakami is located in south-central Iwate Prefecture, in the Kitakami River valley, approximately 45 kilometers south of the prefectural capital of Morioka, and 490 kilometers north of Tokyo. The city is at the confluence of the Kitakami River and the Waga River and has an altitude ranging from 50 to 200 meters above sea level, rising to 400 meters in the east.

Neighboring municipalities
Iwate Prefecture
Hanamaki
Ōshū
Nishiwaga
Kanegasaki

Climate
Kitakami has a humid climate (Köppen Cfa) characterized by mild summers and cold winters. The average annual temperature in Kitakami is 10.5 °C. The average annual rainfall is 1319 mm with September as the wettest month and February as the driest month. The temperatures are highest on average in August, at around 24.3 °C, and lowest in January, at around -2.4 °C.

Demographics
Per Japanese census data, the population of Kitakami has recently plateaued after several decades of growth.

History
The area of present-day Kitakami was part of ancient Mutsu Province, and has been settled since at least the Jōmon period by the Emishi people. The area was a stronghold for the Emishi chieftain Aterui until his death at the hands of Sakanoue Tamuramaro. During the later portion of the Heian period, the area was ruled by the Abe clan, and became a battleground during the Former Nine Years War. The Abe were followed by the Northern Fujiwara clan. During the Sengoku period, the area came under the control of the Nanbu clan. The area was part of Morioka Domain during the Edo period, under the Tokugawa shogunate, with the exception of two villages on its southeastern border, which were under Sendai Domain.

The town of Kurosawajiri was established by the Meiji period creation of the modern municipalities system on April 1, 1891. The modern city of Kitakami was founded on April 1, 1954, by the merger of the town of Kurosawajiri, with the villages of Iitoyo, Futako, Saraki, Oniyanai, Aisari and Fukuoka. On April 1, 1991 Kitakami absorbed the neighboring village of Ezuriko and town of Waga (both from Waga District).

Government
Kitakami has a mayor-council form of government with a directly elected mayor and a unicameral city legislature of 13 members. Kitakami and the town of Nishiwaga collectively contribute four seats to the Iwate Prefectural legislature. In terms of national politics, the city is part of Iwate 3rd district of the lower house of the Diet of Japan.

Economy
The economy of Kitakami was traditionally agricultural; however, due to its ease of access with Sendai and Morioka via the Tōhoku Expressway, the area has rapidly developed into a light manufacturing and transshipment center, with numerous industrial parks.

Education
Kitakami has 17 public elementary schools and nine public junior high schools operated by the city government and five public high schools operated by the Iwate Prefectural Board of Education.

Transportation

Railway
 East Japan Railway Company (JR East) - Tōhoku Shinkansen
 
 East Japan Railway Company (JR East) - Tōhoku Main Line
  - 
 East Japan Railway Company (JR East) - Kitakami Line
 -  -  -  -  - -  -

Highway
  – Kitakami-Kanegasaki IC, Kitakami-Ezuriko IC
  – Kitakami IC, Kitakami-Nishi IC

Local attractions
The city is famous for the sakura that bloom in Tenshochi Park, which is regarded as one of the hundred best places in Japan to view cherry blossoms.

Another hallmark of the city is Oni Kenbai, a traditional sword dance where the dancers dress as demons, performed during the summer festivals, such as Kitakami Michinoku Traditional Dance Festival.

Kitakami also boasts a site that is reputed to be the grave of the famous Heian period waka poet Izumi Shikibu.

National Historic Sites
Kabayama Site, Jōmon period ruins
Ezuriko Kofun Cluster, Kofun period tumuli
Kunimisan temple ruins, Heian period temple ruins,
Hatten Site, Jōmon period settlement ruins
Nanbu-Date border mounds, Edo period border markers

International relations
 – Concord, California, United States, sister cities since October 25, 1974
 – Sanmenxia, Henan Province, China, friendship cities since May 25, 1985

Noted people from Kitakami 
Tamaki Saitō, psychologist
Hiroki Suzuki, actor
Saori Takahashi, professional women's volleyball player
Tatsuo Hirano, politician 
Yoshiaki Fujiwara, professional wrestler
Akira Yaegashi, professional boxer
Yoshida Tatsuya, musician

References

External links

 Official Website 

 
Cities in Iwate Prefecture